Javad Mohammadinejad R. (born 22 March 1985 in Urmia, West Azerbaijan)  is a volleyball player from Iran, who plays as a Middle-blocker for Shahrdari Urmia VC in Iranian Volleyball Super League and Iran men's national volleyball team in the 2011 Asian Men's Volleyball Championship.

References

Living people
Iranian men's volleyball players
People from Urmia
1985 births